MEVA International is a private Iranian company that supplies PC accessories to the international market.

Regional markets
MEVA's primary market in the Middle East is Iran. The company launched its products in April 2008, where the Iranian IT distribution company Maadiran Group became responsible for all aspects of the MEVA brand in Iran.

References

  ITNA News Service - Maadiran launches MEVA in Iran
 Infotech - Maadiran Launches MEVA

External links
 
 Maadiran Group (Iran distributor)
 Maadiran Service (Iran distributor)

Electronics companies of Iran
Electronics companies established in 2008
Information systems
2008 establishments in Iran